Doctor Satan may refer to:

 Dr. Satan, a villain in a series of pulp stories by Paul Ernst that ran in Weird Tales
 Dr. Satan, a character in the film House of 1000 Corpses
 Doctor Satan, a character in the film serial Mysterious Doctor Satan, also known as Doctor Satan's Robot
 Dr. Satan, archenemy of the Japanese superhero Kagestar
 Doctor Satán, a 1966 Mexican film directed by Miguel Morayta
 Marcel Petiot (1897–1946), French doctor and serial killer, active in Paris during World War II